The 1889 Trinity Blue and White football team represented Trinity College (today known as Duke University) in the 1889 college football season. The game with rival North Carolina is still disputed, with both teams claiming a home win by forfeit.

Schedule

References

Trinity
Duke Blue Devils football seasons
Trinity Blue and White football